Heydarieh Mosque is a building in the city of Qazvin in Iran.

Although renovated by Amir Khomär-täsh (Malikshah's vizier) after the earthquake of 1119 CE, the history of construction of this edifice goes back to pre-Islam, where it was a Zoroastrian fire temple. 

The building today sits in the yard of an elementary school, and functions as the school's library and auditorium.

See also
 Islam in Iran

Qazvin
Mosques in Iran
Buildings and structures in Qazvin Province